Michael Merrick Long (11 October 1947 – 17 April 1991) was an Australian actor on stage, television and movies, as well as voice-only.

He appeared in early roles Matlock Police, Homicide, Division 4, Bluey.

He starred in the 1971 Australian stage production of Conduct Unbecoming as Subaltern Millington.

His television credits included: Cop Shop, Prisoner (as Mick O'Brien), Taurus Rising (as Sam Farrer), Sons and Daughters (as Stephen Morrell) and Richmond Hill (as Craig Connors). He appeared in films including Squizzy Taylor, The Chain Reaction and Careful, He Might Hear You.

He provided the voice over television and radio commercials, documentaries and corporate videos, initially working for the ABC. This became his main work, continuing through his illness until a few weeks before his death.

Long died of lung cancer in 1991 at the age of 43.

References

External links
 

Australian male television actors
1947 births
1991 deaths
Deaths from lung cancer
20th-century Australian male actors